The Naulahka: A Story of West and East is a 1892 novel by Rudyard Kipling in collaboration with Wolcott Balestier, which was originally serialized in The Century Magazine from November 1891 to July 1892. The book is set in the fictional state of "Rahore", believed to be based on Rajputana. It was not well-received, either commercially or critically in Kipling's time.

References

1892 British novels
Collaborative novels
Novels first published in serial form